Philotheca pinoides is a species of flowering plant in the family Rutaceae and is endemic to the south-west of Western Australia. It is a small, erect undershrub with needle-shaped, glandular-warty leaves and pale pink or red flowers arranged singly or in groups of up to three in the axil of leaves at the end of branchlets.

Description
The ten stamens are sparsely hairy.

Taxonomy and naming
This philotheca was first formally described in 1970 by Paul Wilson who gave it the name Eriostemon pinoides and published the description in the journal Nuytsia from specimens collected by Charles Gardner on the summit of Mount Peron in 1949. In 1998, Wilson changed the name to Philotheca pinoides in the same journal.

Distribution and habitat
Philotheca pinoides grows in heathland between Eneabba and Badgingarra in the south-west of Western Australia.

Conservation status
Philotheca pinoides is classified as "not threatened" by the Government of Western Australia Department of Parks and Wildlife.

References

pinoides
Flora of Western Australia
Sapindales of Australia
Plants described in 1970
Taxa named by Paul G. Wilson